Rav-Kav (lit. "multi-line") is a reusable contactless stored value smart card for making electronic payments as a joint fare collection system for the different public transportation operators across Israel.

Rav-Kav can be used in public transportation such as all bus companies, light rail trains including Jerusalem Light Rail, as well as the national railway in Israel.

History
Rav-Kav was first introduced in August 2007 by the Ministry of Transportation. Operations started on August 28, 2007 by Kavim, a small bus company serving the suburban cities of Kiryat Ono, Or Yehuda, Yehud and Petah Tikva, as well as several other destinations in the Jezreel Valley area in northern Israel. Several other small companies were to start offering Rav-Kav in the following months, however these were all delayed.

The first major company to offer Rav-Kav was Dan, which serves many bus routes in the Tel Aviv Metropolitan Area. Although Dan was originally supposed to offer Rav-Kav to all passengers in August 2008, Dan only started limited service for student card holders in October, and full service started in January 2009. In March 2010, Dan stopped issuing paper monthly passes, which can now be purchased only with Rav-Kav.

Egged, the largest bus company in the country, did not have a final date set for the introduction of Rav-Kav at the time of its announcement. This was attributed to its large fleet of buses which required a longer integration period. On May 25, 2010, Egged started offering limited Rav-Kav services in the city of Rehovot. These services were later expanded to Karmiel and the Sharon areas, and they include monthly passes and special student and elderly discounts but not the pay as you go product. Egged has provided full Rav-Kav service in the Gush Dan Metropolitan Area starting on July 1, 2011, and joined the existing joint fare collection system between Kavim, Dan and Metropoline. Egged also started offering Rav-Kav service in Jerusalem and Haifa in July 2011.

Israel Railways also did not have a set date for the introduction, however the ministry's spokesman stated at the time of Rav-Kav's introduction that it would be within several months. Rav-Kav was fully integrated by Israel Railways in early 2012.

CityPass, the Jerusalem Light Rail operator, started offering Rav-Kav in May 2011, in advance of the opening of the first line in August.

The introduction of Rav-Kav cards are part of a larger effort to create bus priority in order to quicken the process of riding a bus and encourage people to use public transport over cars. The effort is being led by groups like Transport Today and Tomorrow, which aims to expand sustainable transportation in Israel.

In 2019 in Jerusalem, Rav Kav is the only payment method on buses, whose drivers do not accept cash for the ticket but only for the purchase of a new Rav Kav. Cash will soon no longer be accepted in some other cities.

Personalization
Rav-Kav cards can be either Personal or Anonymous. Personal cards carry the passenger's name and picture, and allow the purchase of a wider variety of products such as monthly passes, student passes and senior-citizen passes. Also, Personalization provides insurance in case of a lost or stolen card. Personal cards can only be issued at the designated purchase points. Transactions carried out on personal cards are tracked, in order to provide the insurance - on report of a lost or stolen card, a new card is issued with the set of credits equivalent to the state of the card when last legitimately used. Data is also aggregated anonymously for statistical purposes.

Recharge

Rav-Kav can be recharged either by an automatic machine by some bus stops, any Citypass light-Rail stops, Convenience stores or a dedicated web site (ravkavonline.co.il/ or HopOn.co.il) and with the RavKav Online or the HopOn mobile apps (for iPhone and Android devices with NFC).

Rav Kav service centers
There are 133 Rav Kav service centers in storefronts all around Israel.  The locations are listed on their website.

Problems
There has been much criticism over the implementation of Rav-Kav, primarily over delays and the lack of a joint fare collection system for all public transportation companies, which severely limit the effectiveness of the card. Also, there have been concerns about the Ministry of Transportation's lack of regulation of the project, as it failed to prevent the delays and bureaucratic issues which have plagued it from the start. There has also been criticism about exclusion of sherut taxis from the early stages of the programme, since they are a very common and popular form of public transportation in Israel.

Delays
The Rav-Kav project suffered many delays since it was first introduced. It was originally intended that all companies providing public transportation services will integrate Rav-Kav by late 2009. However, as of August 2011, Egged, the largest bus company in the country, offers Rav-Kav only in metropolitan areas, leaving the majority of the intercity bus network uncovered. Also, some of the companies which already offer Rav-Kav only provide limited services. This gives Rav-Kav a smaller customer base.

Joint fare collection
The ongoing decentralization of Israel's bus network has created a market of twelve different public transportation companies, and in some cases different companies provide services in the same area. This caused a problem for passengers who require the services of more than one company, since they now have to pay separately for each company's services. Rav-Kav was expected to solve this problem as a joint fare collection system. 
Finally, after much delay, a temporary joint collection system was implemented on May 3, 2010, between the three bus companies currently providing service within Gush Dan- Dan, Kavim, and Metropoline (which only began operating in the area on this date with its acquisition of several bus lines from Dan serving the Sharon region). Customers can now purchase pay-as-you-go credit and use it on any of the three companies in the area. As part of a major reform of the area's bus system, Egged will join the system on July 1, 2011. However this is a temporary system devised by the companies, and it is not yet known when a full joint collection system will be implemented in other areas or between other companies.

Sherut taxis
Share Taxis, known in Hebrew as Moniyyot Sherut, are a popular form of public transit in Israel, used for both regular commuting as well as occasional trips. The fares are comparable to competing bus routes; however, they are currently left out of the Rav-Kav roll out process. The Sherut Taxi Organization claims that leaving the taxis without Rav-Kav would harm their customers and the taxi companies, and that they had demanded to be included in Rav-Kav before the project began. The Ministry of Transportation expressed its support to include taxis in the project. In October 2011, a study was commenced to examine ways of integrating Rav-Kav for payment in Sheruts.

References

External links

Rav Kav main website in English
Rav Kav main website in Hebrew
Rav-Kav information on the National Authority for Public Transportation website 
Rav-Kav information from Israel Railways 
Rav-Kav information from Dan 
Rav-Kav information from Egged 
Rav-Kav information from Metrodan 
Rav-Kav information from Egged Taavura 
Rav Kav information from Veolia 
Rav-Kav technical information (Israel Ministry of Transport) 

Contactless smart cards
Fare collection systems
Public transport in Israel
Bus transport in Israel
Passenger rail transport in Israel